Boulder Dash is a wooden roller coaster located at Lake Compounce in Bristol, Connecticut. Construction for the coaster began in June 1999 and was completed in May 2000. The coaster was built by Custom Coasters International using Southern Yellow Pine wood; while the track is made of Douglas Fir.  Amusement Today annual Golden Ticket Awards ranked Boulder Dash as the world's best wooden roller coaster in 2004 and from 2013 to 2016. The trains were built by Philadelphia Toboggan Coasters.

History 
Construction for the coaster began in June 1999 and was completed in May 2000. The ride cost $6 million and was built into the side of a mountain at Lake Compounce. In the four years prior to the ride's opening, Lake Compounce's owners had spent $40 million on improving the park. The opening of Boulder Dash helped increase attendance at Lake Compounce, which had suffered from declining attendance in prior years.

During the 2007 off-season, about 80 percent of the ride was retracked, and some of the supports replaced, as part of a $3 million renovation. In addition, the end of the ride (which had an intentionally uneven track) was rebuilt. Lake Compounce bought PTC trains from Hersheypark's Wildcat for the 2008 season. For the 2017 season, Boulder Dash received a retracking by Martin and Vleminckx to help smooth out rough patches and replace rotting wood. The retracking also removed the triple-up hill located near the end of the ride, replacing it with a double-up hill.

Characteristics 
The  wooden roller coaster uses Lake Compounce's natural mountainous terrain, complete with trees and boulders within close proximity of the track. It is the longest wooden coaster on the East Coast.

The lift climbs the mountainside and then disappears from view. When it reappears, it has completed its first drop of 115 feet and is traveling sixty miles per hour as it crosses over itself and flies over the station. Much of the first half of the ride is hidden as the train climbs and drops along the mountainside.  On the last drop, on-ride photos are taken and can be viewed and bought at the photo booth at the end of the exit line.

Its layout was inspired by the Rollo Coaster, a small wooden coaster at Idlewild Park (both parks are owned by the same company, Parques Reunidos).

Incidents 
On June 13, 2001, a 23-year-old worker was killed after being struck by a roller coaster train. Occupational Safety and Health Administration (OSHA) officials subsequently visited Lake Compounce and found several safety violations, fining the park $29,000. In November 2001, this fine was halved as part of a settlement between the park and OSHA. The worker's family sued Lake Compounce in 2002 over the accident.

Awards and rankings 
Boulder Dash was voted the world's top wooden roller coaster in 2001 by the National Amusement Park Historical Association. In addition, since 2001, the ride has been one of the top five wooden roller coasters as ranked by Amusement Today's Golden Ticket Awards. The 2004 Golden Ticket Awards was the first in which Boulder Dash was the top-ranked wooden coaster.

Notes

References

External links 
 

Roller coasters introduced in 2000
Roller coasters in Connecticut